Robert Dorfmann (3 March 1912 – 11 August 1999) was a French film producer who worked from the 1950s to the 1970s. He is the father of French film producer Jacques Dorfmann.
His notable films include Luis Buñuel's Tristana (1970), Jean-Pierre Melville's Le cercle rouge (1970), Jacques Tati's Trafic (1971) and Papillon (1973). He was awarded an Honorary César in 1978. He was involved with the French production and distribution company Les Films Corona.

Selected filmography
 Crossroads of Passion (1948)
 Miquette (1950)
 Without Leaving an Address (1951)
 Matrimonial Agency (1952)
 The House on the Dune (1952)
 The Air of Paris (1954)
 Virginie (1962)
 The Bamboo Stroke (1963)
 The Great Silence (1968)
 Papillon (1973)

References

External links

French film producers
1912 births
1999 deaths
César Honorary Award recipients